Pullens’hope Power Station in Mpumalanga, South Africa, is one of South Africa's oldest operating power stations.

History
Hendrina Power Station came into operation between June 1970 and December 1976. Between 1995 and 1997 half of Hendrina's 10 units were refurbished and the other half between 1999 and 2001.

Power generation
The coal-burning station contains ten AEG Kanis 200MW units with a total installed capacity on 2,000MW. Design efficiency at turbine MCR (Maximum Continuous Rating) is 34.20%.  Hendrina, which is the only 10-unit power generating station in South Africa, is the world's largest AEG Kanis turbine installation.

See also 

 Eskom
 Fossil-fuel power plant
 List of power stations in South Africa

References

External links
 Hendrina Power Station on the Eskom-Website

Coal-fired power stations in South Africa
Buildings and structures in Mpumalanga
Economy of Mpumalanga